Leccinum insolens is a species of bolete fungus in the family Boletaceae. It was described as new to science in 1968 by mycologists Alexander H. Smith, Harry D. Thiers, and Roy Watling. The variety brunneomaculatum was also described by these authors.

See also
List of Leccinum species
List of North American boletes

References

Fungi described in 1968
Fungi of North America
insolens
Taxa named by Alexander H. Smith
Taxa named by Harry Delbert Thiers
Taxa named by Roy Watling